Grimaldo is a Romance form of the Germanic personal name Grimwald. It may refer to:

Personal name
 Grimaldo Canella
 Grimaldo González

Surname

 Álex Grimaldo
 José de Grimaldo

See also
 House of Grimaldi, the Monaco dynasty descended from Grimaldo Canella of Genoa
 Grimaldi, Calabria, formerly known as Grimaldo